The PL-7 is the PRC version of the French Magic R.550 air-to-air missile. It is a short-range, Infrared homing missile used by Chinese fighters.  It was designed by Wu Shendao, and produced at the Factory 331 (Zhuzhou Aeroengine factory) (中国株洲航空发动机厂).

Specifications
 Length - 2.74 m
 Diameter - 157 mm
 Wingspan - 0.66 m
 Weight - 89 kg
 Warhead  - 12.5 kg
 Speed - Mach 2.5
 Range - 0.5 to 14 km
 Guidance - Infrared homing

Operational history

During the late 1998–2001 Zimbabwean intervention in the Second Congo War, Air Force of Zimbabwe BAE Hawks were reportedly modified to be armed with PL-7s for air interception missions in support of Zimbabwean and Laurent Kabila's government forces.

Operator

Bangladesh Air Force

 People's Liberation Army Air Force

 Iran Air Force

References

External links
https://web.archive.org/web/20060510171721/http://www.sinodefence.com/airforce/weapon/pl7.asp

Air-to-air missiles of the People's Republic of China
Cold War weapons of China